The following is the standings of Iran Football's 1975–76 football season.

League standings

North Group

South Group

Final League standing 

Machine sazi promoted to 1976–77 Takht Jamshid Cup.

See also 
 1975–76 Takht Jamshid Cup

League 2 (Iran) seasons
Iran
2